Compulsory Education Act may refer to:
Oregon Compulsory Education Act
The Right of Children to Free and Compulsory Education Act (India)

See also
Elementary Education Act 1870 (England and Wales)